HMS Lee was a 20-gun Cyrus-class sixth-rate post ship of the Royal Navy built in 1814 by Josiah and Thomas Brindley, nephews to Lord Nelson, at one of their three yards in Frindsbury in Kent.

The Lee was first commissioned in January 1815 under Captain James Bremer. Following the end of the Napoleonic Wars, in August 1815 Captain John Pasco was given command of HMS Lee and was employed in the English Channel for the suppression of smuggling. He remained her captain until Lee was paid off in September 1818. Lee was retained in ordinary for another four years before she was sold for breaking up in May 1822.

References
 
 Rif Winfield, British Warships in the Age of Sail 1793-1817: Design, Construction, Careers and Fates. 2nd edition, Seaforth Publishing, 2008. .

External links
 

 

Cyrus-class post ships
Ships built on the River Medway
1814 ships